Sylvia Margaret Hume (born 1 February 1968), also known by her married name Sylvia Sinclair, is a New Zealand swimmer.

Hume won gold in 100 m backstroke at the 1986 Commonwealth Games in Edinburgh, Scotland. She competed in two events at the 1988 Summer Olympics. She retired from the sport at age 22. She lives in Bath, England with her husband and their two sons.

References

External links
 

1968 births
Living people
New Zealand female swimmers
Olympic swimmers of New Zealand
Swimmers at the 1988 Summer Olympics
Swimmers from Auckland
People from Bath, Somerset
Commonwealth Games medallists in swimming
Commonwealth Games gold medallists for New Zealand
Swimmers at the 1986 Commonwealth Games
20th-century New Zealand women
21st-century New Zealand women
Medallists at the 1986 Commonwealth Games